The Sepu Kangri (also Sapu Mountain from Chinese) is a mountain in Biru County, Nagqu prefecture, Tibet Autonomous Region. The full name of the mountain is  Sepu Kunglha Karpo, meaning "white snow god".

The mountain is sacred in Tibetan Bon tradition. There is a Bon monastery that is more than half millennium old in the valley below.

Climbing history 
Chris Bonington and Charles Clarke explored the mountain in 1996. In the following two years they tried unsuccessfully to climb Sepu Kangri.

Finally, on October 2, 2002 Carlos Buhler and Mark Newcomb succeeded in first ascent.

References 

Six-thousanders of the Transhimalayas
Six-thousanders of China